Frederik Jäkel (born 7 March 2001) is a German professional footballer who plays as a defender for 2. Bundesliga club Arminia Bielefeld, on loan from RB Leipzig.

Club career
At under-13 level, Jäkel moved from his hometown club Dommitzscher SV Grün-Weiß to the youth academy of RB Leipzig while attending seventh grade at Sportgymnasium Leipzig. In the 2017–18 season he made 19 appearances in the Under 17 Bundesliga, scoring one goal. He also played twice in the play-offs. He also scored one goal the following season, this time playing 20 games in the Under 19 Bundesliga. 

On 25 April 2019, Jäkel signed his first professional contract with RB Leipzig. In the 2019–20 season, he captained the Leipzig under-19 team. With them, he appeared in the UEFA Youth League. For the first team, he was included in the squad for the first time on 1 March 2020 against Bayer Leverkusen.

On 14 July 2020, Jäkel was loaned to Oostende for 2 years. Jäkel made his professional debut with Oostende in a 2-1 Belgian First Division A loss to Anderlecht on 15 December 2020.

On 20 June 2022, Jäkel moved on a new loan to Arminia Bielefeld, with an option to buy.

International career
Jäkel gained four caps for the Germany under-18 team. He made seven appearances at under-19 level, including three in the 2020 UEFA European Under-19 Championship qualification.

Honours
Individual
Fritz Walter Medal U19 Bronze: 2020

References

External links
 
 DFB Profile
 BDFutbol Profile

2001 births
Living people
People from Nordsachsen
German footballers
Germany youth international footballers
RB Leipzig players
K.V. Oostende players
Arminia Bielefeld players
Belgian Pro League players
Association football defenders
German expatriate footballers
German expatriate sportspeople in Belgium
Expatriate footballers in Belgium
Footballers from Saxony